The Osceola Apartment Hotel (also known as Azure Villas) is a historic hotel in Miami Springs, Florida. It is located at 200 Azure Way. On November 1, 1985, it was added to the U.S. National Register of Historic Places.

References

External links

 Dade County listings at National Register of Historic Places
 Dade County listings at Florida's Office of Cultural and Historical Programs

Hotels in Miami-Dade County, Florida
National Register of Historic Places in Miami-Dade County, Florida
Hotel buildings on the National Register of Historic Places in Florida
Pueblo Revival architecture in Miami Springs, Florida